As-Salih Imad ad-Din Abu'l Fida Isma'il, better known as as-Salih Isma'il, (1326 – 4 August 1345) was the Bahri Mamluk sultan of Egypt between June 1342 and August 1345. He was the fourth son of an-Nasir Muhammad to succeed the latter as sultan. His reign saw a level of political stability return to the sultanate. Under his orders or those close to him, his two predecessors and brothers, al-Ashraf Kujuk and an-Nasir Ahmad, were killed. He was succeeded by another brother, al-Kamil Sha'ban.

Early life and family
Isma'il was born in 1324 or 1325 and was likely named after the Ayyubid emir of Hama at the time, Abu'l Fida Isma'il. The latter was a highly favored emir of Isma'il's father, the Mamluk sultan an-Nasir Muhammad (r. 1310–1341). Isma'il's mother was a concubine of an-Nasir Muhammad, whose name is not provided by the Mamluk-era sources.

In 1342, Isma'il married a black slave girl named Ittifaq and had a son (unnamed in sources) with her that year. On 11 July 1343, he married a daughter of Emir Baktamur as-Saqi and had a daughter with her. The following year, on 2 January 1344, he married a daughter of Emir Tuquzdamur al-Hamawi.

Reign
Following an-Nasir Muhammad's death in 1341, three of his sons inherited the sultanate in succession, although the first two, al-Mansur Abu Bakr and al-Ashraf Kujuk, were sultans in name only while senior Mamluk emirs held the actual reins of power. The third son, an-Nasir Ahmad, came to power in January 1342, but was a highly seclusive leader who ruled from the isolated desert fortress of al-Karak, beginning in May. His refusal to return to Cairo and his alienation of the Egyptian emirs led to his dethronement in June. Isma'il, by then known as "as-Salih Isma'il" was chosen by the leading emirs to replace his half-brother Ahmad. He was 17 at the time of his accession to the sultanate in June, but was already well known for his piety. Moreover, he made a pact with the leading Mamluk emirs that he would bring no harm to a mamluk, unless he committed an injustice, in return for the emirs' loyalty.

An-Nasir Ahmad refused to surrender the regalia of the sultanate or recognize Isma'il's accession. Isma'il resolved to arrest him and sent a total of eight military expeditions against an-Nasir Ahmad in al-Karak. The final siege, commanded by Emir Sanjar al-Jawli, succeeded in early July 1344, and an-Nasir Ahmad was captured and soon murdered on the secret orders of Isma'il, who hired a mercenary to accomplish the task. Meanwhile, al-Ashraf Kujuk, who was a young child at the time and was under the care of his mother after being ousted from the sultanate in January 1342, was killed along with his mother as a result of Isma'il's mother's hatred of the ex-sultan; Isma'il had become gravely ill in late 1344 and his mother blamed his illness on al-Ashraf Kujuk's alleged sorcery. In July 1345, Isma'il became bed-ridden and died in August. His stepfather, Arghun al-Ala'i, who had acquired several concurrent senior posts under Isma'il, arranged for Isma'il's full brother, al-Kamil Sha'ban to succeed him as sultan by purchasing many of Isma'il's mamluks on Sha'ban's behalf.

Legacy
Isma'il was deemed the best of an-Nasir Muhammad's sons by the Mamluk-era historian Ibn Taghribirdi. However, according to historian Peter Malcolm Holt, Isma'il' "made little impression on the course of events in his short reign". Isma'il was praised by the Mamluk-era historian Ibrahim al-Qaysarani as the "renewer" (mujaddid) of the Islamic faith in the sultanate during the closing of the first 100 years of Mamluk rule.

References

Bibliography

1326 births
1345 deaths
14th-century Mamluk sultans
Bahri sultans